Rasam refers to:

Rasam (dish), an Indian soup
Rasam (film), a 2015 feature film
Rasam (serial), a Pakistani television drama

See also 
 Razam (disambiguation)